KRSC-FM (91.3 FM) is a student-run college radio station at Rogers State University licensed to Claremore, Oklahoma serving the Tulsa, Oklahoma, area. It broadcasts 24 hours a day at 2200 watts.

Music
The station plays a mix of all styles and is classified as "college alternative." It also hosts a number of specialty shows including punk rock, bluegrass, classic country, reggae, world, Latin, hip hop, ska, electronica, garage and others.

Student Staff
Operations Manager - Maria Turley
Music Director - Sam Satepauhoodle
Traffic Director - Maggie Joyner
Production/Programming - Caleb Broeker
Promotions - Caden Coleman
Community Engagement Coordinator - Vanessa Gaona

Full Time Staff
General Manager - Tip Crowley

Signal
It is possible to hear KRSC in the Tulsa metro area and in some surrounding counties.
The Signal is faint in West and South Tulsa, due to being in a fringe area.

Online Streaming
The station can be heard live worldwide on its online web stream.

References

External links
KRSC-FM official website
KRSC Twitter site
KRSC Facebook
KRSC Instagram

RSC-FM